AMSD may refer to:

 Advanced Multimedia System Design, developer of the AMSD Ariadna web browser
 Australian Message Stick Database, a database of the Cross-Linguistic Linked Data project
 Maritime Surveillance division of PAL Airlines
 Advanced Military Systems Design, former manufacturer of the SAN 511 rifle